Orsilochides is a genus of shield-backed bugs in the family Scutelleridae. There are at least three described species in Orsilochides.

Species
An incomplete list of species belonging to the genus Orsilochides is as follows:
 Orsilochides guttata (Herrich-Schaeffer, 1839)
 Orsilochides leucoptera
 Orsilochides scurrilis
 Orsilochides stictica
 Orsilochides variabilis (Herrich-Schaeffer, 1837)

References

Further reading

 
 
 
 

Scutelleridae
Articles created by Qbugbot